Austrians of Croatia are officially recognized as a minority in the Republic of Croatia, and therefore have their own permanent seat in the Croatian Parliament.

History

Austrians first began settling in Croatia as military personnel after the Croatian nobles met in Cetin to elect Ferdinand I, Archduke of Austria as their king, and in return the Habsburgs would defend Croatia from the Ottoman invasion. This led to the creation of the Military Frontier (Vojna Krajina, German Militaergrenze) within Croatian territory which would be ruled directly from Vienna's military headquarters. This led to an increase of Austrian and other settlers and military elite within the Military Frontier. In 1815, the Habsburgs finally secured possession of Dalmatia and Istria after the fall of Venice. In time the Austrian elite began flocking to the Adriatic for holiday and sunbathing. Towns such as Opatija gained reputations as health resorts and became populated by mainly Austrian season-goers.

Geographic representation
According to the 2011 census, there are 297 people who consider themselves Austrians, with the largest group (35% of Croatia's ethnic Austrians) residing in Zagreb.

Notable individuals
Gordon Schildenfeld, Croatian football player

External links
 Republic of Croatia Ministry of Culture

See also 
 Austria–Croatia relations

References

Austrian diaspora in Europe
 
Ethnic groups in Croatia